Guanajuato, Mexico, may refer to:

The state of Guanajuato, one of the 32 component federal entities of the United Mexican States
Guanajuato, Guanajuato, capital city of that state

See also 
Guanajuato (disambiguation)